Texas's 27th congressional district of the United States House of Representatives covers the coastal bend of Texas' Gulf Coast consisting of Corpus Christi and Victoria up to Bastrop County near Austin. Its current representative is Republican Michael Cloud. Cloud was elected to the district in a special election on June 30, 2018, to replace former Republican representative Blake Farenthold, who had resigned on April 6.

The 27th district was created as a result of the redistricting cycle after the 1980 Census.

The district is slightly less than 50% Hispanic, down from the 70% Hispanic population in the 2002–2010 cycles when the district reached from Corpus Christi to Brownsville.

In August 2017, a panel of federal judges ruled  that the 27th district is unconstitutional, arguing that it displaces a Hispanic-opportunity district. However, the United States Supreme Court later reversed the ruling, pronouncing the district constitutional in Abbott v. Perez.

Election results from presidential races

List of members representing the district

Recent election results

Historical district boundaries

See also
List of United States congressional districts

References

 Congressional Biographical Directory of the United States 1774–present

External links
27th Congressional District of Texas Texas District 27 Information site.

27
Corpus Christi, Texas
Bastrop County, Texas
Calhoun County, Texas
Jackson County, Texas
Lavaca County, Texas
Matagorda County, Texas
Nueces County, Texas
Refugio County, Texas
San Patricio County, Texas
Victoria County, Texas
Wharton County, Texas